Gulliver Lake is a  lake in Doyle Township, Schoolcraft County, Michigan. The lake drains into Lake Michigan through the Gulliver Lake Outlet.

See also 
 List of lakes of Michigan

References

Lakes of Michigan